Sir Frederick William Gentle (12 July 1892 – 24 February 1966) was a British judge. He was educated at Queens' College, Cambridge between 1912 and 1915, in 1951 he was also made an Honorary Fellow of the college. He was Judge Advocate General of the Armed Forces and was knighted in 1947. He was the last of the English Chief Justices of India's Madras High Court (1947–1948). He was the son of Sir William Gentle.

References

 'GENTLE, Sir Frederick (William)’, Who Was Who, A & C Black, 1920–2008; online edn, Oxford University Press, Dec 2007 accessed 20 April 2012

1892 births
1966 deaths
British India judges
Alumni of Queens' College, Cambridge
Knights Bachelor
Chief Justices of the Madras High Court